Dolichoprosopus lethalis is a species of beetle in the family Cerambycidae. It was described by Francis Polkinghorne Pascoe in 1866. It is known from Moluccas.

Subspecies
 Dolichoprosopus lethalis canescens Neervoort van der Poll, 1890
 Dolichoprosopus lethalis lethalis (Pascoe, 1866)
 Dolichoprosopus lethalis maculatus Ritsema, 1881

References

Lamiini
Beetles described in 1866